The 2017–18 Algerian Women's League Cup is the 2nd season of the Algerian Women's League Cup. The competition is open to all Algerian Women's clubs participating in the Algerian Women's Championship. AS Sûreté Nationale wins the cup beating FC Constantine in the final match played in Ahmed Zabana Stadium, Oran.

Round of 16
The first round of the cup was played over 26–27 January 2018.

Quarter-finals
The quarter finals were played on 22 April 2018.

Semi-finals
The semi finals were played on 8 May 2018.

Final
The final was played on 15 May 2018.

References

Algerian Women's League Cup